Margaret Harwood (March 19, 1885  February 6, 1979) was an American astronomer specializing in photometry and the first director of the Maria Mitchell Observatory in Nantucket, Massachusetts. An asteroid discovered in 1960 was named 7040 Harwood in her honor.

Early life and education
Margaret Harwood was born in 1885 in Littleton, Massachusetts, one of nine children of Herbert Joseph Harwood and Emelie Augusta Green. In 1907 she received her AB from Radcliffe College, where she was a member of Phi Beta Kappa. In 1916, she earned her AM from the University of California.

Career

After graduating college, she worked at the Harvard Observatory and taught in private schools in the Boston area. In 1912, an astronomical fellowship was created for women to work at Maria Mitchell Observatory; Harwood was the first recipient of the fellowship, receiving $1,000. In 1916, at 30 years old, Harwood was named director of Mitchell Observatory, and worked there until her retirement in 1957. 
Her specialty, photometry, involved measuring variation in the light of stars and asteroids, and she applied it particularly to that of the small planet 433 Eros. A member of the American Astronomical Society and Fellow of the Royal Astronomical Society, she traveled widely in Europe and the United States. In 1923, she became the first woman to gain access to the Mount Wilson Observatory, and in 1924 was the first woman allowed to use the observatory's 60-inch telescope, the largest in the world at the time.

In 1917, she discovered the asteroid 886 Washingtonia four days before its formal recognition by George Henry Peters. At the time, "senior people around her advised her not to report it as a new discovery because it was inappropriate that a woman should be thrust into the limelight with such a claim". However, Harwood did send her photographs of her discovery to Peters for him to include in his study of the asteroid's orbit. In 1960, an asteroid discovered at Palomar, was named in her honor, 7040 Harwood.

Harwood was a devoted Unitarian. She was a trustee of Nantucket Cottage Hospital and taught at MIT during World War II. She is buried at the Westlawn Cemetery in Littleton.

Honors
Harwood was the first woman to receive an honorary Ph.D. from Oxford University. In 1960, 2642 P-L was discovered by Cornelis Johannes van Houten and Ingrid van Houten-Groeneveld and named Harwood. In 1962, she received the Annie J. Cannon Award in Astronomy.

References

Further reading

External links
Littleton astronomer Margaret Harwood remembered for achievements
Papers of Margaret Harwood, 1891-1971. Schlesinger Library, Radcliffe Institute, Harvard University.

1885 births
1979 deaths
20th-century American scientists
20th-century American women scientists
American women astronomers
Burials in Massachusetts
Harvard College Observatory people
People from Littleton, Massachusetts
Radcliffe College alumni
Recipients of the Annie J. Cannon Award in Astronomy
University of California alumni